The 1976 All-Ireland Senior Camogie Championship Final was the 45th All-Ireland Final and the deciding match of the 1976 All-Ireland Senior Camogie Championship, an inter-county camogie tournament for the top teams in Ireland.

In a low-scoring final, Kilkenny became the first team to win an All-Ireland without scoring a goal, having trailed 0-3 to 0-2 at the break. Maura Sutton scored Dublin's goal.

References

All-Ireland Senior Camogie Championship Finals
All-Ireland Senior Camogie Championship Final
All-Ireland Senior Camogie Championship Final
All-Ireland Senior Camogie Championship Final, 1976